Lewiston Airport may refer to:

 Lewiston-Nez Perce County Airport near Lewiston, Idaho, United States (FAA/IATA: LWS)
 Auburn/Lewiston Municipal Airport near Auburn and Lewiston, Maine, United States (FAA/IATA: LEW)

See also
 Lewistown Municipal Airport, Lewistown, Fergus County, Montana, United States (FAA/IATA: LWT)
 Lewiston (disambiguation)